Reality Check is a book written by Peter Abrahams and published on 28 April 2009 by HarperTeen (an imprint of HarperCollins), going on to win the Edgar Award for Best Young Adult in 2010.

References 

Edgar Award-winning works
Young adult novels